Hugh Smedley is a former New Zealand rower.

At the 1962 British Empire and Commonwealth Games he won the gold medal as part of the men's coxed four alongside fellow Waitaki Boys' High School crew members Keith Heselwood, George Paterson, and Winston Stephens, plus Waikato cox Doug Pulman. Their coach was Rusty Robertson.

References

New Zealand male rowers
Living people
Rowers at the 1962 British Empire and Commonwealth Games
Commonwealth Games gold medallists for New Zealand
Commonwealth Games medallists in rowing
Year of birth missing (living people)
People educated at Waitaki Boys' High School
Medallists at the 1962 British Empire and Commonwealth Games